Habrocestum africanum is a jumping spider species in the genus Habrocestum that lives in South Africa. It was first described in 2009.

References

Endemic fauna of South Africa
Salticidae
Spiders described in 2009
Spiders of South Africa
Taxa named by Wanda Wesołowska